Picket Fences is an American television drama series created by David E. Kelley and produced by David E. Kelley Productions, 20th Television and 20th Century Fox Television. The series tells the story of Rome, Wisconsin, a fictional small town with strange phenomenon and weird criminal activity, producing cases that the police, headed by Sheriff Jimmy Brock, are tasked with solving. Picket Fences aired on CBS from September 18, 1992 to June 26, 1996, broadcasting 88 episodes over four seasons during its initial run.

During the series' run, Picket Fences received nominations for a variety of different awards, including 27 Emmy Awards (with 14 wins), nine Golden Globe Awards (with one win), four Screen Actors Guild Awards (with one win), 2 Directors Guild of America Awards (with one win), and 22 Q Awards (with seven wins). Kathy Baker, who plays lead female character Jill Brock, received the most individual awards and nominations, won 3 Emmy Awards, a Golden Globe award, a SAG award, and 2 Q awards.

Awards and nominations

Emmy Awards

Picket Fences received 27 Primetime Emmy Award nominations, with fourteen wins — twelve Primetime and two Creative Arts. The series won the award for Outstanding Drama Series in 1993 and 1994. Kathy Baker won the award for Outstanding Lead Actress in a Drama Series in 1993, 1995 and 1996, and received a nomination for the award in 1994. Tom Skerritt won the award for Outstanding Lead Actor in a Drama Series in 1993 and was nominated for the award in 1994. The series won the award for Outstanding Supporting Actor in a Drama Series three times, with Fyvush Finkel receiving the award in 1994 and Ray Walston winning the award in 1995 and 1996. Leigh Taylor-Young won the award for Outstanding Supporting Actress in a Drama Series in 1994. Picket Fences also won the award for Outstanding Guest Actor in a Drama Series twice, with Richard Kiley winning in 1994 and Paul Winfield winning in 1995. The two Creative Arts Emmy Awards the series won were for Outstanding Individual Achievement in Costuming for a Series in 1994 and 1995.

Primetime Emmy Awards

Creative Arts Emmy Awards

Golden Globe Awards

Picket Fences received nine Golden Globe Award nominations during its tenure, with one win for Best Actress – Television Series Drama for Kathy Baker.

Screen Actors Guild Awards
Picket Fences received four Screen Actors Guild Award nominations, winning one for Outstanding Performance by a Female Actor in a Drama Series, awarded to Kathy Baker.

Viewers for Quality Television Awards
During its tenure, Picket Fences received 22 nominations for a Q award, presented by Viewers for Quality Television. The series won seven awards: one for Best Quality Drama Series; two for Best Actress in a Quality Drama Series, awarded to Kathy Baker; one for Best Supporting Actor in a Quality Drama Series, awarded to Fyvush Finkel; one for Best Supporting Actress in a Quality Drama Series, awarded to Lauren Holly; one for Best Recurring Player, awarded to Amy Aquino; and one for Specialty Player, awarded to Ray Walston.

Young Artist Awards
Picket Fences received 8 nominations for a Young Artist Award, winning two awards – one for Best Young Actress in a New Television Series, awarded to Holly Marie Combs and one for Best Youth Actor Recurring or Regular in a TV Series, awarded to Adam Wylie.

Other awards

References

External links
 List of Primetime Emmy Awards received by Picket Fences
 List of awards and nominations received by Picket Fences at the Internet Movie Database

Picket Fences
Awards and nominations